Abdul-Rashid Hassan Pelpuo is a Ghanaian politician. He is the current Member of Parliament for Wa Central constituency in the Upper West Region of Ghana.

Early life and education 
He was born on 5 May 1964 and hails from Wa in the Upper West region of Ghana. He had his Middle School Leaving Certificate in 1976. He also had his O level education in 1983 and his A level education in 1986. He also has a Diploma in Economics in 1994 and further had Degree in Psychology in 1994. He also has master's degree in International Affairs in 1998. He holds a PhD in Development Policy from the University of Ghana, African Studies in 2013.

Career 
He was a consultant for the Institute of Policy Alternatives. He was also the Deputy Coordinator of Finance for the National Youth Council and later the Director of the same institution and further became the Agricultural Ag. Regional of the same institution.

Political Life 
He entered the Parliament of Ghana in 2005 after winning a seat on the ticket of the National Democratic Congress in the Ghanaian parliamentary election in December 2004.

Pelpuo was a Minister of State at the office of the President when he was appointed Minister for Youth and Sports by President John Atta Mills in September 2009 following the resignation of Muntaka Mohammed Mubarak who was also MP for Asawase. He served in this capacity until when in a cabinet reshuffle in January 2010. he was replaced by Ghana's first female Minister for Sports, Akua Dansua and appointed deputy Majority Leader in Parliament instead. He was also voted one of Ghana's five Members of the Africa's Parliament in South Africa where he served for a term until 2013. In the John Mahama administration (2012 - 2016) he was appointed Minister of State at the Office of the President in Charge of Private Sector Development and Public Private Partnership (PPP). He was also a member of the Economic Management Team (EMT). In the 2016 he won his seat for the fourth time for another four-year term as the Member of Parliament for the Wa Central Constituency. He was elected chairman of the largest caucus in Parliament of Ghana, The Population and Development Caucus and Leader of the Parliamentarians for Global Action, Ghana Chapter. He also held the ranking member position of the Government Assurance Committee, an important oversight committee that monitors and holds government Ministers to task for promises they make to the people and don't follow up on those promises.See Standing Orders (order 151, 2j) and Parliament Committee on Selection Report, 2020)|date=August 2020}}. Hon Pelpuo also contested the 2020 Parliamentary and Presidential general elections and won for a fifth term of 4 years as the Member of Parliament for Wa Central @2020 Despite Media. He was elected to serve as a third term Chairman of the Population and Development Caucus and Ranking Member of the Lands Committee. He’s also the member of the Energy and Business Committees. See report of 2021 Parliamentary Committee on selection

2004 Elections 
Pelpuo was elected as the member of parliament of the Wa Central constituency in the 2004 Ghanaian general elections. He thus represented the constituency in the 4th parliament of the 4th republic of Ghana. He was elected with 21,272votes out of a total 41,501valid votes cast. This was equivalent to 51.3% of the total valid votes cast. He was elected over Mornah Anbataayela Bernard of the People's National Convention, Mohammed Adama Kpegla of the New Patriotic Party, Abu Mumuni of the Convention People's Party, Osman Mohammed of the Democratic People's Party and Osman Imam Sidik an independent candidate. These obtained 12,280votes, 7,249votes, 376votes, 172votes and 152votes respectively out of the total valid votes cast. These were equivalent to 29.6%, 17.5%, 0.9%,0.4% and 0.4% respectively of the total valid votes cast. Pelpuo was elected on the ticket of the National Democratic Congress. In all the National Democratic Congress won a minority total of 94 parliamentary representation out of 230 seats in the 4th parliament of the 4th republic of Ghana.

Committees 
He is a ranking member of the Lands and Forestry Committee. He is also a member of the Mines and Energy Committee and also a member of Business Committee.

Personal life 
Abdul Rashid is a Muslim.

See also 
List of Mills government ministers
Wa Central constituency
National Democratic Congress

References

 

Living people
Ghanaian Muslims
Ghanaian MPs 2005–2009
Ghanaian MPs 2009–2013
Ghanaian MPs 2013–2017
Place of birth missing (living people)
Government ministers of Ghana
National Democratic Congress (Ghana) politicians
University of Cape Coast alumni
People from Upper West Region
Ghanaian MPs 2021–2025
1964 births